Ivica is a Slavic masculine given name, a diminutive form of Ivan. The direct English equivalent of the name is Johnny, while the equivalent of its augmentative Ivan is John.

It is one of the frequent male given names in Croatia, and is also present in Serbia and Bosnia and Herzegovina.

In Croatia, the name Ivica became one of the most common masculine given name in the decades between 1950 and 1989, peaking at second most common 1970-1979.

Ivica is also a common character in Croatian jokes, like Perica.

In Slovenian, Ivica is both a masculine and feminine given name.

Notable people named Ivica
 Ivica Avramović, Serbian footballer
 Ivica Dačić, Serbian politician, Prime Minister of Serbia
 Ivica Dragutinović, Serbian footballer
 Ivica Džidić, Croatian footballer
 Ivica Grlić, Bosnian Croat footballer
 Ivica Kostelić, Croatian alpine skier
 Ivica Kralj, Montenegrin footballer
 
 Ivica Mornar, Croatian footballer
 Ivica Olić, Croatian footballer
 Ivica Osim, Bosnian  Croat footballer and coach
 Ivica Račan, Croatian politician
 Ivica Rajić, Croatian soldier
 Ivica Šerfezi, Croatian singer

See also

References

Given names
Masculine given names
Bosnian masculine given names
Croatian masculine given names
Serbian masculine given names
Slovene feminine given names
Unisex given names